Puthiamputhur is a town in Thoothukudi district of the Indian state of Tamil Nadu.

Puthiamputhur is a small town. It is located at Ottapidaram taluk in Tuticorin district. It is 17 km from Tuticorin towards west, 4 km from Ottapidaram towards south and 15 km from Puthukkottai towards north. 613 km from State capital Chennai. The Puthiamputhur is called as Kutty Japan, Thennagathin Tirupur and Readymade City. Around 5000 families are living in this area.

History

Before 1950s-
Puthiamputhur, the name was called Pothiamathur (Pothi (load) + Amathur (rest taken area)). That means before the year of 1950 that the times there was no buses to travel, for which they were used donkey & cows for their trade and personal travels. This was an intersection of the Thoothukudi-Maniyachi and Pudukottai-Ottapidaram Routes. So the Puthiamputhur is a best area to take rest for long journey peoples / walkers and who were utilized the area. Hence the village was called as Pothiamathur. Then the name has been changed step by step as Pothimuthoor and finally we are calling as Puthiamputhur. But always north Indian peoples are called as English: Puthimbatore. Because of the reason, may be the way of their pronunciation.

After 1950s 
It was the time to very famous for Guava (koyya) fruit. The fruits were producing in the area huge and also having good name for the (koyya) Guava fruits. The entire south districts occupied the "Puthiamputhur Koyya" with specified name in the markets. Because of the reason is that the land was having different kind of magical soil for producing the fruits and also having fantastic tastes by nature of soil. The guava fruits were two types of cultivation. one is red guava and another one is white guava (Seeni guava), mostly the white guava size will be up normal and very big as like coconut.

1950s
One of Historical place in Puthiamputhur is Weekly Market. It is one of the oldest weekly market in district. The market will open on every Wednesday. When we enter into the market, we have to take pay for token for each entry. In 1970's the market was so special and significant to purchase all kind of products like goat, Cow, chicken, pot, iron materials, fruits, clothes, Saree, luxury and domestic product, household, resalable items, etc. The market has been located at the center point of nearby villages and as well as connected with all the main roads to Thoothukudi, Pudukottai via Thattaparai, Ottapidaram, Maniyacchi and Puthurpandiapuram. This Market was an ideal location for 20 km radius villages. Tuticorin district people utilizing the market to buy and sale all the house hold items with cheapest and negotiable price. Now the Weekly market using for only to trade goats.

1970s
In the period is a very peak time for cultivating flowers. Particularly Samanki, Pichi, Malli, etc. Those days, the samanki flowers oil extracted and packed as Tin bottles and which is exported to foreign countries from the Puthiamputhur. Even though biggest part of the flower cultivation was there, above said the flower's Market prices determined by the Puthiamputhur traders in Tuticorin District. Due to uncertain factors like climate changes, seasonal rain failures, not able to continue flowers cultivation peacefully.

Readymade manufacturing
Formerly, Mr. Alagusundaram was introduced the readymade manufacturing process in Puthiamputhur. He was started garments factory in a mall level in the year of 1954.  When he started the garments, he was only four tailors. Then the success indicates him to make next level and he expand the business. It was a starting point of the cloth manufacturing industry to enter into this area. Frequently, His brothers Mr. Durai raja and Mr.Maharaja joined as one hand with their brother Mr. Alagusundaram's business. They were earned more than sufficient profit in their business. The big success was created a lot of new entrepreneur. They were involved in this readymade manufacturing business sub-sequencing Mr.Pichiah, Mr.Thangalingam, etc. The main products time like underwear, petticoat, trousers, tap trousers, jippa shirts, umbrella pavadai, blouse, etc.  These kinds of normal and regulal clothes manufactured locally made and traded in Tamilnadu.

After 1984
Around 27 garments factories started in the year of 1984. They purchased their raw material mainly from Madurai & Chennai. They used to sell their goods all over south Tamil Nadu. Puthiyamputhur readymade got a trade mark because of the better quality and cheapest price. The garment industry development was unbelievable and people started to depend their life with the Garment industry through contributing as a worker or Trader. The readymade business take the village to next level of its era..

2000 to 2010s
Expanded around 200 small scale factories were in the period of 2000 to 2004 Puthiamputhur. These garments factories started to sell their own manufacturing products throughout Tamil Nadu. It was made an unexpected growth of garments industry in Puthiamputhur. This is the peak time for industry and attracted more people to involve into the business. New Entrepreneur comes to the industry and contributed major part of overall supplies in Tamil Nadu.

2005 to 2006
It was the critical crisis period for Puthiamputhur in the Cloths manufacturing industry. Around 60 companies were consolidated their business in this period. Rest of the companies out of 200 companies involved financial crisis problems and other major problems like Man power shortage, Heavy market competition, Failure of work from home Model, Price negotiation, Compromising on quality,  Accumulation of higher Production volume, Lower Sales volume, Decreasing buying capacity, unbalanced Payment cycling from buyers etc.

After 2007 
Identified Solution for the Industry failure by various Readymade garments associations leader and Owners through organized committee and healthy discussions. They focused to resolve the identified the listed problems.  Everybody contributed and given their efforts in due course. following the sufficient activities were taken among the company owners. Understood the problems and they were adopted into new business model to trade without spoil other business. They focused on all over cost cutting methods, Bulk purchase from single buyer for 2 or more companies, Lowest price of goods. Bill to Bill credit business, Cash and carry method etc. This was another milestone of the industry. Many company owners collaborated themselves as joined one hand. The owners getting orders from one buyer for many companies. Hence again the industry performed right way. Again the production volume increased with competitive price. One of the main reason for the Industry performance is start followed many owners joined and doing bulk Material purchases from Surat, Kolkata, Mumbai, Delhi, Belwar, Banglore, Chennai,Madurai etc.

Now
They have succeeded with their life journey. Around 10,000 people are living by the Puthiamputhur garments industry. The employees are everyone may earn Rs.5,000 to Rs.20,000/month. Puthiamputhur is contributing 40% (approximately) of Readymade dresses in Tamil Nadu. Above 250 companies are running now. In which produced dresses are going to sell including Tamil Nadu, Pondicherry, Kerala, Andrapradesh, Karnadaka etc. Puthiamputhur is having goodwill in the garments industry.

Employment
Around 10,000 people are working in the garments industry. Piece rate methods are following here. Weekly and Monthly Labour wages payment method. Labor scarce problem is notable one. In the crisis period, maximum numbers of peoples were went back to their old Job and shifted their work to other industry. The lack of workers problem was very difficult to manage by the owners. Hence the clothes stitching charges has been changed as above 100% (Rate per piece). The stitching charges increasing year on year. Retaining the employees is very difficult to handle. Companies encouraging branches out of Puthiamputhur and Work from Home Model. Now lot of sub-branches are running in our district.

They are:
Tuticorin,Vallinayagapuram, Naduvakkurichy, Jambulingapuram, Muppilivetti, Ottapidaram, Rajavinkovil, S.Puthur, Kailasapuram, Savarimangalam, Thattaparai, Puthukottai, Siloncolany, Sekkarakkudi, Verapandiapuram,  Vellaram, Pasuvanthanai, Kovilpatti, Kulathur, Vilathikulam, Mappilaiyurani, Sillanatham, Saminatham, Melavittan, Madathur, Perurani, Umarikadu, Earal, Aaral, etc. All of these areas are having branches of Puthiamputhur companies.

Overview
Above 250 Ready made garments private companies, 3 Elementary schools, 2 higher secondary schools, 3 children's schools, 1 Government hospital and 5 Private hospitals and  Medicals. police station, Panchayat office, Union office. Government library. Lodge, Cinema theater, Petrol bunks, Government technical training centre, 3 Churches and lot of Hindu temples, Islam masuthi, Rice mills, Power plant, private banks, society bank, TMB BANK ATM and AXIS BANK ATM centres, 2 financial institutions, 3 government ration stores, government tax centre, government health centre, Government wastage utilizing centre, Typewriting centre, around 20 Women's self associations, jewellery shops  etc.

Transportation
Puthiamputhur to chennai transportation facility is available. This town is well connected to Kovilpatti, Ottapidaram & Thoothukudi and direct transportation speciality to Madurai, Tirunelveli, Eral, Tiruchendur & etc..

How to Reach
Below Listed the Railway stations to reach Puthiyamputhur
Kailasapuram Rail Way Station (5Km)
Tattapparai Rail Way Station (4Km)
Tuticorin Railway Station (17Km)

External links 
puthiamputhur.com

Cities and towns in Thoothukudi district